"Not a Day Goes By" is a song written by Maribeth Derry and Steve Diamond, and recorded by American country music band Lonestar. It was released in January 2002 as the third single from their 2001 album, I'm Already There. The song reached the Top 5 on the Billboard Hot Country Singles & Tracks chart.

Content
The narrator discusses a breakup and states that he thinks about his ex every day.

Due to its tone and subject matter, "Not a Day Goes By" is considered one of Lonestar’s darker songs, alongside "I’m Already There", their 2001 single revolving around family separation.

Music video
The music video was directed by Lawrence Carroll and premiered in early 2002.

Chart performance
"Not a Day Goes By" debuted at number 58 on the U.S. Billboard Hot Country Singles & Tracks for the week of January 26, 2002.

Year-end charts

References

2002 singles
2001 songs
Lonestar songs
Song recordings produced by Dann Huff
BNA Records singles
Songs written by Maribeth Derry
Songs written by Steve Diamond (songwriter)
Country ballads